Driencourt is a commune in the Somme department in Hauts-de-France in northern France.

Geography

Population

History
As with many towns in this part of France, World War I saw the place reduced to rubble.
A Parisian architect, Jacques Debat-Ponsan, was employed to design and reconstruct the town's public buildings.
 Reconstruction of the school and Mayor's office – accomplished in 1927
 Reconstruction of the church achieved in 1920
 Other reconstructions. A certain number of homes, judging by their style, were rebuilt by the same architect.

See also
Communes of the Somme department

References

Communes of Somme (department)